The Baria State, also known as Bariya State, was one of the princely states of India during the period of the British Raj. It was under the Rewa Kantha Agency of the Bombay Presidency and had its capital in Devgadh Baria town of present-day Dahod district in Gujarat state. The Baria State was ruled by Kshatriya Koli chieftains of Baria clan (Gotra) of Gujarat.

See also
 Bombay Presidency
 Political integration of India

References

Princely states of Gujarat
Bombay Presidency
Rajputs
1524 establishments in India
1948 disestablishments in India